The following lists events that happened during 1996 in South Africa.

Incumbents
 President: Nelson Mandela.
 Deputy President: F.W. de Klerk (until 30 June) along with Thabo Mbeki.
 Chief Justice: Michael Corbett then vacant.

Cabinet 
The Cabinet, together with the President and the Deputy President, forms part of the Executive.

National Assembly

Provincial Premiers 
 Eastern Cape Province: Raymond Mhlaba 
 Free State Province: Mosiuoa Lekota (until 18 December), Ivy Matsepe-Casaburri (since 18 December)
 Gauteng Province: Tokyo Sexwale
 KwaZulu-Natal Province: Frank Mdlalose
 Limpopo Province: Ngoako Ramathlodi
 Mpumalanga Province: Mathews Phosa
 North West Province: Popo Molefe 
 Northern Cape Province: Manne Dipico
 Western Cape Province: Hernus Kriel

Events

January
 15 – King Moshoeshoe II of Lesotho is killed in a car accident.

February
 26 – South Africa and Algeria restore diplomatic ties.
 Prince Philip, Duke of Edinburgh, in his capacity as Grand President of the British Commonwealth Ex-Services League, visits South Africa.

March
 11 – The trial of General Magnus Malan and 19 co-accused begins in the Durban Supreme Court.
 19 – President Nelson Mandela is granted a divorce from Winnie Mandela in the Rand Supreme Court.
 23 – Approximately 6,000 Inkatha Freedom Party supporters armed with fighting sticks, spears, clubs and battle axes rally in the Tugela Ferry area of KwaZulu-Natal in defiance of a national ban on traditional weapons.

April
 15 – The Truth and Reconciliation Commission begins its formal hearings.

May
 2 – South Africa and China exchange letters granting each other most-favoured-nation status.
 8 – South Africa's new constitution is adopted by the Constitutional Assembly.
 9 – The National Party withdraws from the coalition government, giving the African National Congress full political control.

June
 19 – Cuban Foreign Minister Roberto Robaina Gonzalez visits South Africa.

July
 Nelson Mandela visits the United Kingdom on a state visit.

August
 4 – Rashaad Staggie, Hard Livings gang leader, is killed by the vigilante group People Against Gangsterism and Drugs.
 Mimi Coertse receives the highest accolade an artist can receive from the Austrian government, the Oesterreichishe Ehrenkreuz für Wissenschaft und Kunst.

September
 6 – The Constitutional Court delivers judgment on the new constitution.
 11 – A mining agreement on wages and working conditions is signed between the Chamber of Mines and the National Union of Mineworkers.

October
 11 – The constitution is amended by the Constitutional Assembly.
 30 – Colonel Eugene de Kock of the South African Police is sentenced to 212 years in prison.
 General Magnus Malan and 19 co-accused are acquitted on all charges relating to the massacre of 13 people in KwaMakhuta township south of Durban in 1987.
 The first South African National Census since the end of apartheid is held.

December
 4 – A number of agreements relating to culture, double taxation, fiscal evasion and a memorandum of understanding relating to defence equipment are signed by Thabo Mbeki, Deputy President of South Africa, on a state visit to India. 
 10 – The new constitution is signed into law.

Unknown date
 Trevor Manuel is appointed Minister of Finance.
 Paraffin Safety Association of Southern Africa is founded.

Births
 17 February – Sasha Pieterse, actress
 1 March – Jane de Wet, actress
 3 March – Andile Phehlukwayo, cricketer
 5 March – Kirsten Beckett, artistic gymnast
 29 March – Lungi Ngidi, cricketer
 22 April – Ilze Hattingh, tennis player
 22 April – Herschel Jantjies, rugby player
 26 May – Lara Goodall, cricketer

Deaths
 15 January – King Moshoeshoe II of Lesotho. (b. 1938)
 28 March – Siegfried Mynhardt, actor. (b. 1906)
 16 December – Laurens van der Post, author and political adviser. (b. 1906)

Sports
Bafana Bafana wins African Cup of Nation.

Athletics
 25 February – Josia Thugwane wins his second national title in the men's marathon, clocking 2:11:46 in Pinelands.

References

South Africa
Years in South Africa
History of South Africa